Antingham is a village and civil parish in the north of the English county of Norfolk. The civil parish has an area of 6.12 square kilometres and in the 2001 census had a population of 287 in 120 households, the population increasing to 355 at the 2011 Census. For the purposes of local government, the parish falls within the district of North Norfolk.

History
The name of 'Antingham' originates from an Old English word meaning "homestead of the family or followers of a man called Anta".

Antingham has an entry in the Domesday Book of 1085 where the village, its population, records of land ownership, and details about productive resources were extensively detailed. In the survey Antingham is variously recorded by the names Antigeham, Antingham, and Attinga. The main tenants at the time were Roger Bigot and Thurston Fitzguy. The survey notes the presence of four villagers and four smallholders on the land. A meadow, acreage, and ploughs of various values are among the items recorded under Antingham.

St Mary's  parish church, at the south of the village close to the A149 in Church Lane, stands next to the ruins of St Margaret’s Church which was abandoned in the late 17th century. Material from St Margaret's was used to repair St Mary's after they had both fallen into disrepair.

The village was struck by an F1/T2 tornado on 23 November 1981, as part of the record-breaking nationwide tornado outbreak on that day.

Geography
The parish of Antingham has boundaries with seven other neighbouring parishes. To the north are the parishes of Thorpe Market and Southrepps. The eastern boundary, which follows the River Ant, is with Swafield, and south are the parishes of North Walsham and Felmingham. To west lies the parishes of Hanworth and Suffield with most of this boundary following the edge of Gunton Park. The parish is dissected north to south by the A149 road from King’s Lynn to Great Yarmouth. The parish also straddles the railway line which runs between Sheringham, Cromer and Norwich. 
In the south east corner of the parish are Antingham Ponds which are the source of the River Ant, a tributary of the River Bure.

The village of Antingham sits on the Southrepps road which is on the eastern side of the A149 and runs north to south from that road to the village of Southrepps. The centre of the village is at the crossroads of Elderton Lane, Sandy Lane and Southrepps Road. There is a level crossing on Southrepps Road 200 metres south of this crossroads.

Transport
The nearest railway station is at Gunton for the Bittern Line which runs between Sheringham, Cromer and Norwich.

War Memorial
Antingham War Memorial is located in the churchyard for St. Mary's Church and holds the following names for the First World War:

 Major Leslie F. St John, MC (1893-1918), 20th Squadron, Machine Gun Corps
 Rifleman Ronald W. Whitwood (d.1917), Rifle Brigade (The Prince Consort's Own)
 Private George R. Whitwood (d.1917), 1st Battalion, Royal Norfolk Regiment
 Private Walter E. Empson (d.1918), 7th Battalion,  Royal East Kent Regiment

And the following for the Second World War:
 Private Eric W. Green (1920-1945), 5th Battalion, Royal Norfolk Regiment
 Marine Eric W. Gotts (1919-1942), 40 Commando, Royal Marines

References

External links

Information from Genuki Norfolk on Antingham.
Antingham Bone Mills
Antingham  1875-1975

Villages in Norfolk
Civil parishes in Norfolk
North Norfolk